Sir John Maclean may refer to:

Sir John Maclean, 4th Baronet (1670–1716), Scottish noble who was the 20th Clan Chief of Clan Maclean from 1674 to 1716
Sir John Maclean, 1st Baronet (1604–1666), Scottish noble who moved to Sweden and took the name John Hans Makeléer and married Anna Gubbertz
Sir John MacLean (historian) (1811–1895), British civil servant, genealogist and author

See also
John MacLean (disambiguation)
John Makeleer